The King and I is a 1999 American animated musical film directed by Richard Rich. It is the only animated feature film produced by Morgan Creek Entertainment. Loosely based on Richard Rodgers and Oscar Hammerstein II's 1951 stage musical of the same name, it portrays a fictionalized account of English school teacher Anna Leonowens' historical encounter with the King of Siam Mongkut, and royal court. The voice cast stars Miranda Richardson and Martin Vidnovic as Leonowens and Mongkut, respectively, with Ian Richardson, Darrell Hammond, and Adam Wylie. The score, songs, and some of the character names come from the stage musical. Screenwriters Peter Bakalian, Jacqueline Feather, and David Seidler took creative liberties with the history and with the source material from the musical in an attempt to make the film palatable to all audiences.

The King and I was released on March 19, 1999, eight months prior to Anna and the King, a live-action adaptation of the same story. The critical consensus on Rotten Tomatoes calls it "charmless and shoddily animated." The King and I earned $12 million at the box office and its gross was seen as disappointing compared to that of other animated films released at the time. The film received five nominations including the London Critics Circle Film Award for British Actress of the Year for Richarson and the Golden Reel Award for Best Sound Editing in Animated Feature.

Aside from foreign films, TV shows, and direct-to-video films, The King and I was the final mainstream theatrical film to officially be released under the Warner Bros. Family Entertainment banner. Warner Bros. has since released theatrical family films under their standard Warner Bros. Pictures banner.

Plot

In 1862, a ship sails from London to Bangkok – on board are Anna Leonowens and her son Louis. Kralahome, the Prime Minister, uses his powers of illusion to cause it to appear as if a massive sea serpent is attacking the ship as it's battered in a storm. Anna, with the help of Captain Orton, manage to save Louis from drowning, and they all manage to fend off the sea serpent by whistling. As they approach Bangkok, the captain explains to Anna how the kingdom is politically structured.

In the Grand Palace of Siam, Anna witnesses King Mongkut receive a gift in the form of a slave – a young woman named Tuptim from Burma. Despite being promised her own house outside the palace, Anna is denied it. The King drags Anna to his workshop in which he tests new inventions such as hot air balloons and trains. Louis is taken on a tour of the armory by Kralahome's henchman, Master Little, who barely misses an injury and begins to lose his teeth one after the other. In the palace gardens, Prince Chulalongkorn meets Tuptim and they fall in love, but Chulalongkorn keeps his true identity hidden. While the King's wives help her unpack, Anna sees Chulalongkorn and Tuptim in the courtyard and supports their relationship. Since she will not receive the house, she wants to leave, but she soon changes her mind after meeting the royal children, especially Chulalongkorn.

With Kralahome still plotting to overthrow the King, he writes a letter to officials from the British Empire – led by Sir Edward – that claims Anna is in danger. As for Anna, she begins to teach the royal children, especially given that they have never been outside the palace walls. To give the hands-on experience, she takes all of them around the city to see how other people live, which in turn angers the King. Kralahome reports it from Master Little, who tells him of seeing the outing. It boils over into a fight, with Anna still complaining about the house that she was promised but has yet to receive.

Chulalongkorn meets with his father to discuss traditions. He wants to be with Tuptim, but he knows that his father would never allow it. Confused, Mongkut goes to pray to Buddha. Kralahome then uses his powers on the statues in the room to try and attack the King, whose pet black panther, Rama, manage to fight them off with a roar. While Chulalongkorn is kickboxing, Tuptim finally learns that he is the crown prince and that their love is forbidden. However, he tells her that he does not care about tradition and wants to be with her. Master Little learns of their relationship and tells Kralahome, who plans to use it to anger the King at the right time.

Anna goes to the King and sees he is troubled after learning that the British are coming because he is allegedly a barbarian, which she knows is false. Anna advises Mongkut to throw a banquet for the British when they arrive, so that he can show them he is civilized. At the dinner, Kralahome mentions the royal ivory pendant that the King is supposed to wear, which he gave to his son, who then gave it to Tuptim. When it is revealed that Chulalongkorn gave it away, Tuptim is brought in by the guards. Dishonored by the relationship, the King threatens to whip Tuptim to death, but finds that he can't do it – she and Chulalongkorn later escape into the jungle with Louis on elephants.

While they escape, Kralahome uses his powers to guide them through the jungle across a rope bridge. The bridge collapses, and Tuptim and Chulalongkorn are almost swept away by a river. The King, having had a change of heart and using one of his hot air balloons, rescues them with Louis's help in distracting Master Little's interference. However, on their journey back to the palace, Kralahome fires a firework, destroys the balloon, and causes it to crash. Everyone but Mongkut is able to jump into a lake to safety. Kralahome celebrates his apparent victory of killing the King, but ends up exposing his true nature in front of Sir Edward and the royal guards.

An injured, bedridden Mongkut tells his son to be ready to lead Siam if he dies, and allows him and Tuptim to be married and becoming king and queen. With his evil schemes of overthrowing the King exposed, Kralahome loses his position – as a punishment, he is forced to clean the elephant stables, with Master Little as his boss, who now loses all his teeth and attacks him. The King heals from his injury and presents Anna with her house outside the palace walls, and the two of them dance.

Voice cast

Production

Development
After the success of Walt Disney Feature Animation's The Little Mermaid (1989), Warner Bros. began distributing several animated films such as The Nutcracker Prince (1990) and Rover Dangerfield (1991), respectively. However, it was the success of The Lion King (1994) that convinced other Hollywood studios to consider producing in-house animated feature films.

In 1991, Morgan Creek Entertainment began a distribution deal with Warner Bros. to release their films within the United States. In 1994, the company established Warner Bros. Feature Animation, hiring Max Howard a year later to preside over the new division. In 1994, Arthur Rankin Jr., the head of Rankin/Bass Productions, had toured Thailand where he considered adapting The King and I into an animated feature film. Together with his partner Jules Bass, they were able to convince the Rodgers and Hammerstein Organization, who held the copyright to the musical, that an animated feature film "would be a superb way" to expand the property. Both parties struck a deal with the organization getting a potential share of the box office gross. Rankin/Bass then recruited Morgan Creek as the production company.

Writing
Prior to the release of Quest for Camelot (1998), screenwriters David Seidler and Jacqueline Feather were contracted to adapt the film for Morgan Creek, to be released under the Warner Bros. Family Entertainment label. In 1998, it was revealed the plot had been "slightly altered" from the original musical "in the interest of family viewing." However, no changes could be made without the approval by the Rodgers and Hammerstein Organization. According to then-president Ted Chapin, it was known within the organization that the changes would be a risk, but they hoped the film would "introduce a generation of younger people to the show, earlier than they might have been under normal circumstances".

Design and animation
Each of the characters in the film were designed by a team of animators consisting of Bronwen Barry, Elena Kravets, and Michael Coppieters. The final design of each character had to receive final approval from James G. Robinson, the head of Morgan Creek Entertainment. Over one thousand animators were hired in over 24 countries across four different continents to hand draw each second of the film. Patrick Gleeson and Colm Duggan served as the supervising animators for domestic production, while additional animation was outsourced to Giant Productions, Canuck Creations, Partners in Production, Manigates Animacion, and Stardust Pictures. Clean-up animation was contracted to Hanho Heung-Up in Seoul, South Korea.

Music
A soundtrack album was released on March 16, 1999 by Sony Classical Records. It was released on both CD and cassette formats. Many songs from the original musical are performed in this film. All the songs on the album were originally composed by Oscar Hammerstein II and Richard Rodgers. The Philharmonia Orchestra covers the instrumental score.

William Ruhlmann of Allmusic.com gave the album a rating of 3 stars out of 5, describing it as a "surprisingly adequate" soundtrack to a "badly received" film. He adds, however, that the "overly effusive vocal performances" and "overly busy arrangements" make it "by far the worst version of this music ever recorded", and cites the use of "nine different orchestrators" as a possible factor. He concludes by conceding that there is good singing on the album. John Kenrick, in his article Comparative CD Reviews Part III, describes the 1999 recording as a "total disgrace" that sees "superb Broadway singers...labor against mindless cuts and gooey orchestrations". In a relatively negative review of the animated adaption, The Rodgers and Hammerstein Encyclopedia does say that "some of the songs survive nicely, and the singing vocals throughout are very proficient".

Songs

Release
As with most film adaptations of Anna and the King of Siam, the film was banned in Thailand.

Home media
The King and I was released on VHS and DVD on July 6, 1999 by Warner Home Video. During its home video release, the film remained in the top 20 of Billboards Top Kid Video Chart for over 15 weeks. In December 1999, the film became the sixteenth best-selling children's title of 1999. The film was later made available on Amazon Prime when the streaming service premiered on August 1, 2011. The film was listed on iTunes for digital sale in 2010.

Mill Creek Entertainment released the Blu-ray/digital combo pack of the film on October 6, 2020.

Reception

Box office
The King and I earned $4 million during its opening weekend, occupying the sixth spot at the box office. The film ultimately grossed under $12 million at the box office. Its release also coincided with Doug's 1st Movie, which was released the following week.

Critical reception
On Rotten Tomatoes, The King and I has an approval rating of 13% based on 24 reviews, with an average rating of 3.51/10. The site's critical consensus reads, "Charmless and shoddily animated, The King and I pales in comparison to its classic namesake in every way." Historian Thomas Hischak wrote that it was "surprising to think that the Rodgers & Hammerstein Organization allowed it to be made ... children have enjoyed The King and I for five decades without relying on dancing dragons". Hischak, in his work The Oxford Companion to the American Musical: Theatre, Film, and Television, says the film is "easily the worst treatment of any Rodgers and Hammerstein property". The Rodgers and Hammerstein Encyclopedia says "whether or not one agrees about the 1956 film of The King and I being the best R&H movie, most would concede that [the] animated adaption is the worst". Roger Ebert gave it 2 stars out of 4 and felt that animated adaptations of musicals have potential but found the film rather dull.

See also
 Anna and the King of Siam – The original book which inspired the original musical.
 The King and I – The original Broadway musical which inspired the 1999 film.

References

External links

 
 
 
 
 
 
 
 

1999 films
1999 animated films
1990s American animated films
1999 children's films
1999 fantasy films
1999 musical films
American children's animated fantasy films
American children's animated musical films
Animated films about elephants
Animated films about monkeys
Films based on musicals
Films directed by Richard Rich
Films set in the 1860s
Films set in Thailand
Morgan Creek Productions films
Musical films based on actual events
Warner Bros. animated films
Warner Bros. films
Films based on adaptations
Rankin/Bass Productions films
1990s children's animated films
Animation based on real people
Cultural depictions of Anna Leonowens
Cultural depictions of Mongkut
Censored films
The King and I
1990s English-language films